Riders of the Purple Sage is a 1925 American silent Western film directed by Lynn Reynolds and starring Tom Mix, Mabel Ballin, and Warner Oland. Based on the 1912 novel Riders of the Purple Sage by Zane Grey, the film is about a former Texas Ranger who pursues a corrupt lawyer who abducted his married sister and niece. His search leads him to a remote Arizona ranch and the love of a good woman.

The film is preserved today.

Plot
When corrupt lawyer Lew Walters (Warner Oland) is run out of a Texas town, he abducts Millie Erne (Beatrice Burnham) and her young daughter Bess and forces them to accompany him, leaving behind a heartbroken husband and father. Millie's brother, Texas Ranger Jim Carson (Tom Mix), leaves his service behind, takes the name Jim Lassiter, and dedicates his life to finding Walters and his sister and niece. After many years, his search leads him to Cottonwood, Arizona, and the ranch of Jane Withersteen (Mabel Ballin). Jane is attracted to the stranger after he rescues her chief rider, Bern Venders (Harold Goodwin), from being flogged for a crime he did not commit. She tells him that Millie died while searching for her daughter after little Bess was abducted.

Lassiter and Venters go after a gang of rustlers who have been raiding the Withersteen ranch and stealing their cattle. They wound and capture the masked leader of the gang, who turns out to be a young beautiful woman. She is revealed to be Bess Erne (Marion Nixon), Lassiter's long-lost niece. Venters takes charge of the wounded girl, taking her to a secret location, Surprise Valley. The two soon fall in love, and leave the valley to marry.

Meanwhile, Jane admits to Lassiter that the man he is hunting, Lew Walters, is in fact a local judge, now calling himself Judge Dyer. Lassiter rides into town and rushes into Dyer's courtroom, shooting the villain with deadly precision. Soon after, a posse is formed and goes after Lassiter, who flees with Jane and her adopted ward, Fay Larkin (Dawn O'Day), into the mountains surrounding Surprise Valley. They take refuge from their pursuers on a high plateau overlooking the entrance to the valley. The only approach to their hiding place is by a set of stairs cut into the side of the cliff. Lassiter rolls a boulder down from the heights to block the posse's path. There is now no way out. He, Jane and little Fay are trapped inside Surprise Valley forever.

Cast

 Tom Mix as Jim Carson / Jim Lassiter
 Mabel Ballin as Jane Withersteen
 Warner Oland as Lew Walkers / Judge Dyer
 Beatrice Burnham as Millie Erne
 Arthur Morrison as Frank Erne
 Wilfred Lucas as Oldring
 Charles Le Moyne as Richard Tull
 Harold Goodwin as Bern Venters
 Hank Bell as Barfly (uncredited)
 Gary Cooper as Rider (uncredited)
 Seessel Anne Johnson as Bess Erne, as a Child (uncredited)
 Fred Kohler as Henchman Tom Metzger (uncredited)
 Charles Newton as Henchman Joe Herd (uncredited)
 Marian Nixon as Bess Erne (uncredited)
 Joe Rickson as Henchman Dave Slack (uncredited)
 Anne Shirley as Fay Larkin (uncredited)
 Mark Hamilton as Outlaw in Mr Tull's Gang (uncredited)
 Tony the Wonder Horse as Jim's horse

Production
Riders of the Purple Sage was filmed on location in Lone Pine, California and the nearby Alabama Hills. The film features an uncredited bit role by future film star Gary Cooper as a rider. Warner Oland, who plays the corrupt lawyer Lew Walters, would later star in the Charlie Chan films.

Reception
Riders of the Purple Sage received generally poor reviews upon its theatrical release. The reviewer for The New York Times criticized the film's lack of entertainment quality, while acknowledging Tom Mix's appeal and attraction to his fans. The reviewer for Variety wrote:

In his review for Allmovie, Hans J. Wollstein gave the film a positive review, praising Tom Mix for his performance.

See also
 Riders of the Purple Sage
 Tom Mix filmography

References

External links

 
 
 
  Riders of the Purple Sage available for free download at Internet Archive

1925 films
1925 Western (genre) films
Films based on works by Zane Grey
Fox Film films
Films based on American novels
Films directed by Lynn Reynolds
Films shot in Lone Pine, California
American black-and-white films
Silent American Western (genre) films
1920s American films
1920s English-language films